Adron Lamar Chambers (born October 8, 1986) is an American former professional baseball outfielder. He played in Major League Baseball (MLB) for the St. Louis Cardinals from 2011 to 2013.

Early life
Prior to playing professionally, Chambers attended Pensacola High School where he was the star quarterback for his team. He went on to attend Mississippi State University on a football scholarship before resuming his baseball career at Pensacola Junior College. He was drafted by the St. Louis Cardinals in the 38th round of the 2007 amateur draft.

Baseball career

St. Louis Cardinals
He began his professional career in 2007, playing for the Johnson City Cardinals, hitting .279 in 36 games. In 2008, he played for the Quad Cities River Bandits, hitting .238 with 13 stolen bases in 95 games. He played for the Palm Beach Cardinals in 2009, hitting .283 with 21 stolen bases and 16 triples in 122 games. He split 2010 between the Springfield Cardinals (75 games) and Memphis Redbirds (37 games), hitting a combined .283 with 14 stolen bases in 112 games.

On September 6, 2011, Chambers was called up to play for the St. Louis Cardinals. On September 16, 2011, during his second major league at-bat, Chambers earned his first Major League hit which brought in the go ahead runs for the Cardinals to beat the Phillies. Chambers, who had been brought in as a defensive sub for Lance Berkman attempted an inside the park home run, but was tagged out at the plate. Nevertheless, he was credited with a triple off of Michael Schwimer who had walked Albert Pujols in order to get to Chambers.

Chambers was also noted for his contributions off the field to help spur the Cardinals on during their quest to win the Wild Card playoff berth. With the Cardinals' playoff hopes looking much in doubt prior to the bottom of the ninth inning during their game on September 24, 2011 against arch-rival Chicago Cubs, Chambers was shown on the WGN television broadcast of the game taking it upon himself to encourage and excite the hometown fans to join him in cheering for the team prior to the start of the inning. Incredibly, the Cardinals began to rally, and Chambers himself was then inserted into the game as a pinch-runner, where he proceeded to score the winning run during a wild pitch. That down-to-the wire win was one of many
that month that helped the Cardinals earn their playoff berth.

On October 28, 2011 Adron Chambers was added to the St. Louis Cardinals World Series roster as an emergency replacement for the injured Matt Holliday before game 7 of the 2011 World Series against the Texas Rangers. 

After splitting time between St. Louis and the team's minor league system in 2012 and 2013, Chambers was out-righted off the Cardinals roster on November 5, 2013 and elected free agency. In 2013, he had four hits in 26 at bats with St. Louis. He was kept on the Cardinals active roster through the 2013 National League Divisional Series and the 2013 National League Championship Series.

Houston Astros
Chambers signed a minor league deal with the Houston Astros in November 2013. He played in 17 games with the Astros during Spring Training before being assigned to the Triple-A Oklahoma City RedHawks to begin 2014. He was the team's Opening Day center-fielder and leadoff hitter, but injured himself on a slide, dislocating his left ring finger in the 4th inning, and he was placed on the disabled list. He was activated on May 11 and played that day. In 25 games for the RedHawks, Chambers hit .281 with 2 HR and 15 RBI.

Toronto Blue Jays
On June 12, Chambers was traded to the Toronto Blue Jays for two minor leaguers, LHP Alejandro Solarte and 2B Will Dupont. The Blue Jays assigned him to the Triple-A Buffalo Bisons.

Chicago Cubs
On December 23, 2014 Chambers signed with the Chicago Cubs on a minor league deal.

Bridgeport Bluefish
On June 13, 2016, Chambers signed with the Bridgeport Bluefish of the Atlantic League of Professional Baseball. He was released on July 26, 2016.

Ottawa Champions
On August 12, 2016, Chambers signed with the Ottawa Champions of the Can-Am League. He won the Championship title with the Champions, defeating the Rockland Boulders 3-2 in a best of 5 series on September 17, 2016. He re-signed on December 16, 2016.

Sussex County Miners
On June 3, 2017, Chambers was traded to the Sussex County Miners. He was released on August 14, 2017.

Philadelphia Phillies
In February 2018, Chambers signed a minor league deal with the Philadelphia Phillies. He was assigned to AAA Lehigh Valley IronPigs for the 2018 season. Chambers was released on August 3, 2018.

Ottawa Champions (second stint)
On August 13, 2019, Chambers signed with the Ottawa Champions of the Can-Am League. He became a free agent following the season.

References

External links
, or Retrosheet, or Baseball Reference (Minor, Fall and Independent leagues), or Pura Pelota (Venezuelan Winter League)

1986 births
Living people
American expatriate baseball players in Canada
African-American baseball players
Baseball players from Pensacola, Florida
Bridgeport Bluefish players
Buffalo Bisons (minor league) players
Cangrejeros de Santurce (baseball) players
Gary SouthShore RailCats players
Iowa Cubs players
Johnson City Cardinals players
Leones del Caracas players
Liga de Béisbol Profesional Roberto Clemente outfielders
Major League Baseball outfielders
Memphis Redbirds players
Navegantes del Magallanes players
American expatriate baseball players in Venezuela
Oklahoma City RedHawks players
Ottawa Champions players
Palm Beach Cardinals players
Pensacola State Pirates baseball players
Quad Cities River Bandits players
Springfield Cardinals players
St. Louis Cardinals players
Surprise Rafters players
21st-century African-American sportspeople
20th-century African-American people